The Puch 250 SGS (Schwing-Gabel-Sport) is a motorcycle that was manufactured by the Austrian Steyr Daimler Puch AG's Puch division in Thondorf near Graz. The motorcycle is powered by a split-single two-stroke engine (two pistons sharing a single combustion chamber). It was marketed in the United States by Sears as the "Allstate 250" or "Twingle", with the model number SR 250, and sold primarily via the Sears catalog. It was a common "first motorcycle" for many riders.

A total of 38,584 Puch 250 SGS motorcycles were produced between its launch on October 1, 1953 and end of production in 1969, with its final year of sale in 1970.

See also 
 Puch
 Split-single
 List of motorcycles by type of engine
 Sears Dreadnought (1910s m. bike)
 List of motorcycles of the 1950s

References

External links 
  Puch Klub Grieskirchen

250 SGS
Motorcycles introduced in 1953